Andrés Quintana, O.F.M. (November 27, 1777 – October 12, 1812) was a Roman Catholic Spanish priest and missionary of the Franciscan Order who labored at Mission Santa Cruz in California during the early part of the 19th century.

Born in Antonossa, in the Province of Álava (Basque County), Spain, Andrés Quintana joined the Franciscan Order in 1794 when he was 17 years of age. Nine years later he had completed his formation and achieved the priesthood in the province of Cantabria (in northern Spain), as did a great many of the Spanish missionaries. In 1804 he sailed to the New World to join the missionary College of San Fernando de Mexico, a springboard for all missionaries doing work in New Spain. There he received further instruction and preparation for his assignment to Mission Santa Cruz. Sailing from San Blas in 1805, he arrived at Monterey, the capital of Spanish Alta California, and became one of two missionary fathers stationed at Mission Santa Cruz.

He was killed at the mission on the evening of October 12, 1812, by Native Americans under his care. The following notation appears on his burial record:

According to another source, Brother Andrés was murdered because of his plans to use a metal-tipped whip to punish Native American converts. He is considered one of two martyr priests who served in the coastal missions of California. The publication of this oral history given by Lorenzo Asisara in 1878 by scholar and Native American Edward Castillo in 1989 was counted as proof that Spaniards treated Indians with brutality at missions. Later, the story was immortalized in at least one novel.

References

Notes
 
 

1777 births
Roman Catholic missionaries in New Spain
Spanish Friars Minor
Martyred Roman Catholic priests
Priests of the Spanish missions in California
Spanish Roman Catholic missionaries
1812 deaths
19th-century Roman Catholic martyrs
19th-century Spanish Roman Catholic priests
Spanish people murdered abroad
People murdered in California